Stagonomus venustissimus, common name woundwort shieldbug, is a species of shieldbug belonging to the family Pentatomidae, subfamily Pentatominae.

Scientific name
The species was first named by Fabricius as Cimex melanocephalus. However this name had already been used by Linnaeus for the mirid bug now known as Phylus melanocephalus - at the time, the genus Cimex encompassed the entirety of the Heteroptera.

The replacement name Eysarcoris fabricii given by Kirkaldy in 1904 was used for many years, but Rider (1998) pointed out the seniority of the name venustissimus, given by Schrank in 1776 (Schönste Wanze, most beautiful bug).

This species has been recently transferred to the genus Stagonomus, so the correct name is Stagonomus venustissimus (Schrank, 1776).

Distribution
This species can be found in most of Europe.

Description
These small bugs have a greenish-grey body. The head and the  pronotum are copper coloured. They have a bronze-purple triangular stain at the base of the scutellum. The connexivum has black and white markings. The legs are whitish with black spots

Biology
 Stagonomus venustissimus is a univoltine species. The larvae are visible  from late June to October, while the new generation of adults appear from August through the following July.

The nymphs feed on hedge woundwort (Stachys sylvatica), particularly the seeds, and on Lamiaceae species, especially on white dead-nettle (Lamium album).

Gallery

References

External links
 EOL
 Biolib
 Nature Spot

Eysarcorini
Insects described in 1776
Hemiptera of Europe
Taxa named by Franz von Paula Schrank